Stanydale is a hamlet on the island of Mainland, Shetland, Scotland.  
The west cairn was described in 1931 as "A round cairn, about 50' in diameter and 3' high, which has been much destroyed."

References
Citations

Sources

External links

Scottish Places - Stanydale

Villages in Mainland, Shetland